Audrey Hochberg (June 26, 1933 – June 8, 2005) was an American politician from New York.

Life
She was born Audrey Elaine Golden on June 26, 1933, in Stamford, Fairfield County, Connecticut,  the daughter of Abraham H. Golden and Fannie (Dodek) Golden. She graduated B.S. in economics from Radcliffe College in 1955. Then she worked as a securities analyst. She married Herbert L. Hochberg, and they had three daughters. They lived in Scarsdale, Westchester County, New York.

She became active in the anti-war movement triggered by the Vietnam War, and entered politics as a Democrat. She was a member of the Westchester County Legislature from 1972 to 1992; and a member of the New York State Assembly from 1993 to 2000, sitting in the 190th, 191st, 192nd and 193rd New York State Legislatures. In March 2000, she announced that she would not seek re-election later that year.

She died on June 8, 2005, in NewYork–Presbyterian Hospital in Manhattan, of uterine cancer.

References

1933 births
2005 deaths
People from Scarsdale, New York
Women state legislators in New York (state)
Democratic Party members of the New York State Assembly
Radcliffe College alumni
Legislators from Westchester County, New York
Deaths from cancer in New York (state)
20th-century American politicians
20th-century American women politicians
21st-century American women